Justin Louis  Baldoni (born January 24, 1984) is an American actor and filmmaker. He is best known for  portraying Rafael Solano on The CW satirical romantic dramedy Jane the Virgin (2014–2019) as well as directing the films Five Feet Apart (2019) and Clouds (2020).

Early life 
Baldoni was born in Los Angeles, California, and was raised in Medford, Oregon, the son of Sharon and Sam Baldoni. His mother is from a Jewish family and his father is of Italian ancestry. His paternal grandfather is Louis Baldoni, an Indiana senator and Italian immigrant. Baldoni's parents joined the Baháʼí Faith, which Baldoni practices devoutly. Baldoni played soccer and ran track in high school, and was a radio disc jockey at a local top-40 radio station.  While moving into a new apartment building, Baldoni met a manager who advised him to pursue a career in acting. He attended college on a partial athletic scholarship, but later dropped out.

Career 
In 2008, Baldoni wrote, produced, and directed his first music video that was selected and won him his first "Audience Choice Award" at Dawn Breakers International Film Festival.

In 2012, Baldoni created a digital documentary series, My Last Days, a show about living – as told by the dying. The show eventually became one of the most-watched documentary series' streamed online. The second season of My Last Days aired on CW and third season was released in the winter of 2018. On the heels of that success Baldoni founded Wayfarer Entertainment, a digital media studio focused on disruptive inspiration. In December 2018, Baldoni spoke at the annual End Well Symposium about why he believes that thinking about our death can help us live better.

From 2014 to 2019, Baldoni played Rafael Solano in the CW show Jane the Virgin. In May 2016 he launched a time-lapse video app for pregnant women and new mums called Belly Bump.

In July 2017, Variety announced that Baldoni was developing a male talk show through his media company Wayfarer Entertainment. The show, entitled Man Enough, is described as a disruptive panel series that explores what it means to be a man today. In an interview, Baldoni described the reason he created the show. "Man Enough really came about because I wanted to take a dive into what it really means to be a man, and this question of 'do we have it right?'" The show includes prominent men like Matt McGorry and Javier Muñoz. In August 2017, TED announced Baldoni would be a speaker at the annual TEDWomen Conference. 

Baldoni directed and produced CBS Films' Five Feet Apart, starring Cole Sprouse and Haley Lu Richardson, and based on an original script by Mikki Daughtry and Tobias Iaconis. The film was released on March 15, 2019, and chronicles the lives of two teenagers living with cystic fibrosis.

He directed and produced Clouds, a film depicting the life of musician Zach Sobiech with Warner Bros. On May 14, 2020, it was announced Disney+ had acquired distribution rights to the film from Warner Bros., in light of the impact of the COVID-19 pandemic on the film industry. It was released on October 16, 2020. He is also scheduled to direct, produce, and star in It Ends with Us, based on the novel of the same name by Colleen Hoover.

In 2021, Baldoni released a book under the same premise as his previous talk show and TED Talk titled Man Enough: Undefining my Masculinity. He began a podcast series under the same name with co-hosts Liz Plank and Jamey Heath. A children's version of the book Boys Will be Human was released in October 2022.

Wayfarer Studios 
Baldoni founded a production company with Ahmed Musiol called Wayfarer Studios that produces television, films, and digital content. In 2019, Wayfarer sold majority stake setting up the $25M content fund. The philanthropic branch of the company, called the Wayfarer Foundation, benefits homeless residents of Los Angeles. They host an annual Skid Row Carnival of Love, which provides resources for employment, education, non-emergency medical care, food, clothing, hygiene, and other festivities such as face-painting, live concerts, and children's activities, serving over 4,000 homeless guests each year.

Personal life 
After over a year of dating, Baldoni married Swedish actress Emily Baldoni (née Fuxler) in July 2013 in Corona, California. They have a daughter, Maiya, who was born in June 2015 and a son named Maxwell, who was born in October 2017.

Filmography

Film

Television

References

External links 
 

21st-century American male actors
American Bahá'ís
American male television actors
American people of Italian descent
American people of Jewish descent
California State University, Long Beach alumni
People from Medford, Oregon
21st-century Bahá'ís
American radio DJs
Male actors from Los Angeles
Male actors from Oregon
1984 births
Living people